The 2022 Nigeria FA Cup (known as the 2022 Aiteo Cup for sponsorship reasons), is the 75th edition of the Nigeria FA Cup, Nigeria's elite cup tournament for football clubs. It commenced on 26 July.

This year's tournament sees 72 clubs from 36 states and the FCT qualify as their state cup winners and runners-up.

League representation

Schedule

Format
As with previous editions, it will be a single elimination knockout tournament with all matches played at neutral venues. The 18 lowest ranked clubs (mostly debutants) will enter the rookie stage, the winners of the rookie stage will join the remaining 55 clubs at the first round. If a match ends in a draw, it goes straight to a penalty shoot-out.

Rookie stage

|colspan="3"|26 July 2022

|-
|colspan="3"|27 July 2022
|-

|}

First round

|colspan="3"|30 July 2022

|-
|colspan="3"|31 July 2022
|-

|}

Round of 32

|colspan="3"|3 August 2022
|-

|}

Round of 16

|colspan="3"|6 August 2022
|-

|-
|colspan="3"|7 August 2022
|-

|}

Quarterfinals

|colspan="3"|10 August 2022
|-

|}

References

2021–22 in Nigerian football
Fa Cup